Richard Treat (or Trott) (15841669) was an early settler in New England and a patentee of the Royal Charter of Connecticut, 1662.

Biography

Early life and ancestors

He was baptized on August 28, 1584, at Pitminster, county of Somerset, England, the son of Robert and Honoria Trott, and died on April 27, 1669, at Wethersfield, Hartford County, Connecticut. He was an early New England settler who emigrated from Pitminster, England, to the Massachusetts Bay Colony in 1637.

Marriage and family
He was married on April 27, 1615, at Pitminster, Somerset County, England, to Alice Gaylord (born May 10, 1594, at Pitminster, Somerset County, England, she died at Wethersfield, Hartford County, Connecticut).  She was the daughter of Hugh Gaylord and Joanna.

Richard and Alice were the parents of 11 children. Their son, Robert Treat (1624–1710), served as governor of Connecticut from 1683 to 1698. Their daughter, Joanna, was the wife of Lieut. John Hollister. Their daughter, Susanna, was the wife of Robert Webster, the son of John Webster (governor). Their daughter, Honor, married John Deming, an early Puritan settler and original patentee of the Royal Charter of Connecticut. Their daughter, Sarah, married Matthew Camfield (1604 - 1673) circa 1643 at New Haven Colony, an early Puritan settler of New Haven Colony and a founder of Newark, New Jersey in 1666.

Career
He was one of the first settlers of Wethersfield, Connecticut in 1637 and was an extensive landowner in the town (over 900 acres). He represented Wethersfield in the first general court in 1637. He was appointed in 1642 by the general court, in connection with Gov. George Wyllys, Messrs. Haines, Hopkins, Whiting, and others, to superintend building a ship, and to collect a revenue for that object.

In the list of Freeman (Colonial) of Wethersfield for 1659, only three besides Richard Treat, Sr., are styled Mr., and he bore that title as early as 1642, and perhaps earlier. Mr. Treat must have been a man of high social standing and of much influence in the town of Wethersfield, and in the colony of Connecticut.

He was chosen a juror, June 15, 1643 and grand juror, on September 15 of the same year.

In April, 1644, he was chosen deputy, and was annually elected for fourteen years, up to 1657-8. From 1658 to 1665, he was elected assistant magistrate of the colony eight times, and was named in the royal charter of Charles II as one of the original patentees of the Charter of the Colony of Connecticut.
On Oct. 25,1644, he and Mr. Wells were the committee and the revenue collectors of the Fenwick tax a fund for the support of students in the college at Cambridge. In 1654, he was chosen on a committee to lay out lands granted by the town and in 1660, he was elected a townsman, an office answering to the present selectmen

Descendants
Richard Treat's descendants number in the thousands today. Some of his notable descendants include:

George Herbert Walker Bush, 41st President of the United States
George Walker Bush, 43rd President of the United States
Samuel Colt, inventor and industrialist.
Robert Treat Paine, a signer of the Declaration of Independence
 Dr. John Franklin Gray, the first practitioner of Homeopathy in the United States.
Gerald Warner Brace, writer, educator, sailor and boat builder.
Gideon Welles, Secretary of the Navy, 1861–1869.
William Edwards Deming statistician, professor, author, lecturer, and consultant
Treat Williams, Actor/Pilot
C. Loring Brace, anthropologist
Henry Ford II, president, chairman of the board and CEO of Ford Motor Company.
John B. Hollister, Representative from Ohio
Stephen Crane, author (The Red Badge of Courage)
Thomas Edison, inventor
John Pierpont Morgan, financier
Charles H. Treat, Treasurer of the United States from 1905–1909
Charles W. Woodworth, entomologist
Samuel Hubbel Treat, Jr., federal judge
John Hunt Morgan, Confederate general and cavalry officer in the American Civil War
Samuel Treat, federal judge
Roger Treat, sportswriter and author
Treat Baldwin Johnson, chemist
Tennessee Williams, playwright
John Hay Whitney U.S. Ambassador to the United Kingdom, publisher of the New York Herald Tribune.
Cornelius Vanderbilt Whitney businessman, film producer, writer, and government official
Robert Treat, (February 23, 1624 – July 12, 1710) was an American colonial leader, militia officer and governor of the Connecticut Colony between 1683 and 1698.

Notes

References
Case, L. W. The Hollister family of America: Lieut. John Hollister, of Wethersfield, Conn., and his descendants  Publisher Fergus printing company, 1886
Deming, Judson Keith. Genealogy of the descendants of John Deming of Wethersfield, Connecticut: with historical notes University of Wisconsin - Madison: Publisher Press of Mathis-Mets Co., 1904
Raymond, Marcius D. Sketch of Rev. Blackleach Burritt and related Stratford families : a paper read before the Fairfield County Historical Society, at Bridgeport, Conn., Friday evening, Feb. 19, 1892. Bridgeport : Fairfield County Historical Society 1892.
Treat, John Harvey. Title The Treat family: a genealogy of Trott, Tratt, and Treat for fifteen generations, and four hundred and fifty years in England and America, containing more than fifteen hundred families in America Publisher The Salem press publishing & printing company, 1893.
William Treat Obituary Obituary
 Canfield, Frederick A.  A History of Thomas Canfield and of Matthew Camfield, With a Genealogy of their Descendants in New Jersey.  Dover, N.J.:  1897.  Reprinted Bibliolife.

1584 births
1669 deaths
People of colonial Connecticut
American city founders
People from Somerset
Kingdom of England emigrants to Massachusetts Bay Colony
Magistrates of the Connecticut General Court (1636–1662)
Deputies of the Connecticut General Court (1639–1662)
People from Wethersfield, Connecticut